Bellflower may refer to:
Bellflower, California, a city in Los Angeles County
Bellflower, Illinois, a village in McLean County
 Bellflower, Missouri, a city in Montgomery County
Bellflower, one of several plant species in the family Campanulaceae
Bellflower, one of any plant species in the genus Campanula
American bellflower
Chinese bellflower
Bonnet bellflower
Bellflower (film), a 2011 American film
Bellflower apple

See also
The Bellflower Bunnies, an animated series based on the Beechwood Bunny Tales book series by Geneviève Huriet